Layers of Lies is the fourth album from Swedish melodic death metal band Darkane, issued on 27 June 2005.

The release of this album took sometime since the last album because Peter Wildoer suffered a severe hand injury in 2003 which left him uncertain whether
he would drum again but miraculously a year later recovered. Along with that
Wildoer became busy with Christofer Malmström new project at the time, Non-Human Level.

This was the last album to feature vocalist Andreas Sydow who left in 2007.

Track listing
 Amnesia of the Wildoerian Apocalypse - 1:42
 Secondary Effects - 3:55
 Organic Canvas - 4:30
 Fading Dimensions - 4:19
 Layers of Lies - 4:17
 Godforsaken Universe - 4:05
 Klastrophobic Hibernation - 0:36
 Vision of Degradation - 4:37
 Contaminated - 3:38
 Maelstrom Crisis - 2:40
 Decadent Messiah - 3:54
 The Creation Insane - 4:37
 Subliminal Seduction (Bonus Track) - 4:00

Credits

Darkane
Andreas Sydow - vocals
Christofer Malmström - lead guitar, tenor
Klas Ideberg - rhythm guitar
Jörgen Löfberg - bass guitar
Peter Wildoer - drums, percussion

The Orchestra
Tomas Ebrelius - violins/viola
Charlotta Weber Sjöhol - cello
Markus Närvik - double bass
Joakim Wåhlstedt - french horn
Anders Jonsson - tuba

Choir Personnel
Christian Odeholm - engineer
Per Nyrén - conductor

Soprano Choir
Catarina Crivelius Horvat
Birgit Böckmann
Carin Borgström
Susanne Bengtsson
Mette Bryngemark
Christina Nyrén
Therese Malmström

Alto Choir
Eva Forsell
Gerturd Hanson
Gull-Britt Linell Persson
Christina Engman
Susanne Kjellsson
Erika Nordahl
Isabelle Malmström

Bass Choir
Per Hallberg
Åke Pesson
Pehr Bengtson
Sven Nordahl
Jan Forsell
Ulf Nilsson
Niclas Fröhberg

Tenor Choir
Martin Fröhberg
Hans Malmsteen
Johan Sandberg
Christer Lundin
Krister Hedlund
Agenta Falkengren

References

Darkane albums
2005 albums
Nuclear Blast albums